The Fifth Doctor comic stories is a collection of the offscreen adventures of the fifth incarnation of the Doctor, the protagonist of the hit sc-fi series, Doctor Who.

History
The Doctor Who Magazine launched the Fifth Doctor's comic strip adventures with the Doctor travelling on his own. Later a number of new and familiar characters were included. (These decisions were largely determined by the issue of image rights).

While most of the adventures occur within their own continuity, direct references to the television series make placing these adventures into on-screen continuity problematic.

While Doctor Who Magazine mostly used the current Doctor in the regular comic strip adventures, Fifth Doctor comic strip stories have appeared from time to time in the regular magazine, specials and in other publications since his television retirement.

Comics

Doctor Who Magazine

Doctor Who Yearbook

Doctor Who Annuals

Short stories

Doctor Who Annuals

See also
 List of Doctor Who comic stories
 First Doctor comic stories
 Second Doctor comic stories
 Third Doctor comic stories
 Fourth Doctor comic strips
 Sixth Doctor comic stories
 Seventh Doctor comic stories
 Eighth Doctor comic stories
 War Doctor comic stories
 Ninth Doctor comic stories
 Tenth Doctor comic stories
 Eleventh Doctor comic stories
 Twelfth Doctor comic stories

Comics based on Doctor Who
Fifth Doctor stories